Christophe Didillon (born 1971 in Aurich, Germany) is an artist (acrylic paintings, collages, photos).
He had also become a member of PARADOX artist group and OMMA.

Accomplishments

He participated at the opening of "The Free Will – 20 Years Glasnost" art exhibition in Berlin and handed over his present (painting named “GLASNOST”) to Gorbachev. Scholarship by the Otto-Flath-Foundation.

In May 2006 Didillon made his WALK OF FLAME, a pilgrimage from San Francisco to Hollywood, dedicating his pilgrimage to the actress Kirsten Dunst and to his grandfather Johannes Schumacher, who had been a prisoner of war in Russia during World War II, and had escaped by walking hundreds of miles home to his family in Germany.

Exhibitions
He has had many single and group exhibitions in Germany and other countries.
The artist was admitted to the virtual gallery of German Ministry of Foreign Affairs.
He had exhibitions at Nankai University Museum of Contemporary Art Tianjin and at Shandong Province Government, China.
He participated in "The Dragon of East and West", international art exchange projects between artists from Germany and China, with group exhibitions in different German and Chinese cities.
He had a single exhibition at the Parliament of Hessen in the city of Wiesbaden, Germany.
Further exhibitions in China, the United States and Greece are being prepared at Beijing, Shanghai, Weihai, Shenzhen, Hong Kong, and other cities in Southern China and Taiwan as good as Santa Barbara (USA) and Chania (Greece).

He created paintings for Mikhail Gorbachev and Crown Princess Victoria of Sweden.

Awards
Didillon was appointed as "Consultant of International Art" by the chairman of the Hua Cui Artists Community of Tianjin, Madame Gu Yingzhi.

Protest action
On February 1, 2007 Didillon threatened to commit suicide under the Brandenburg Gate in Berlin as a protest "against the silent repression of the meaning of human dignity out of the modern society life."

Collection of contributions
Didillon creates a collection of charities for Amnesty International and its fight against female genital mutilation in the Third World and elsewhere. The artist wants to raise funds and find sponsors to collect the amount of $1 million. For this purpose he did a pilgrimage on the Camino de Santiago from Germany to Santiago de Compostela in Spain in the late summer of 2007. Didillon had to end his pilgrimage after a foot injury in France. Donors could send a contribution directly to Amnesty International.

Art project for kids suffering from cancer
At the Cannes Film Festival 2008, Didillon established an art project for kids suffering from cancer. He created paintings together with prominent persons in order to auction them to benefit a society that advocates the interests of children and juveniles suffering from cancer.

See also
 List of German painters

Footnotes

External links
 http://www.didillon.eu
 http://openpr.com/news/45952.html
 https://web.archive.org/web/20080916103843/http://www.newsmax.de/pitt-and-clooney-show-heart-for-children-suffering-from-cancer-news18651.html
 https://web.archive.org/web/20110719071845/http://www.paradox-online.de/Start/Kuenstler/Didillon/Didillon_Cannes/didillon_cannes.html

Living people
1971 births
20th-century German painters
20th-century German male artists
German male painters
21st-century German painters
21st-century German male artists